Visa requirements for Costa Rican citizens are administrative entry restrictions by the authorities of other states placed on citizens of Costa Rica.

As of 11 January 2022, Costa Rican citizens had visa-free or visa on arrival access to 150 countries and territories, ranking the Costa Rican passport 30th overall and first among Central American countries, in terms of travel freedom according to the Henley Passport Index.

Visa requirements map

Visa requirements 
Visa requirements for holders of normal passports traveling for tourist purposes:

Non-visa restrictions

See also

Visa policy of Costa Rica
Costa Rican passport

References and Notes
References

Notes

Costa Rica
Foreign relations of Costa Rica